Charles Sherman Woodruff, Jr. (August 15, 1846 – September 6, 1927) was an American archer who competed in the 1904 Summer Olympics. He was born in Cincinnati, Ohio and died in Chicago.

In 1904 he won the silver medal in the team competition. In the double American round he finished fourth and in the double York round he finished eighth.

His wife, Emily Woodruff, also competed in the 1904 Olympics.

References

External links
 
 profile

1846 births
1927 deaths
American male archers
Archers at the 1904 Summer Olympics
Olympic silver medalists for the United States in archery
Medalists at the 1904 Summer Olympics
Sportspeople from Cincinnati